Sir James Hight  (3 November 1870 – 17 May 1958) was a New Zealand university professor, educational administrator and historian. He was born in Halswell in Christchurch, New Zealand on 3 November 1870. He died on 17 May 1958 and is buried at Linwood Cemetery.

Hight was appointed a Companion of the Order of St Michael and St George in the 1932 King's Birthday Honours. In 1935, he was awarded the King George V Silver Jubilee Medal. In the 1947 New Year Honours he was appointed a Knight Commander of the Order of the British Empire for services to education.

The library building at the University of Canterbury is named for him.

References

External links
 

1870 births
1958 deaths
New Zealand educators
20th-century New Zealand historians
Academic staff of the University of Canterbury
Burials at Linwood Cemetery, Christchurch
New Zealand Companions of the Order of St Michael and St George
New Zealand Knights Commander of the Order of the British Empire